Karangan (also Romanized as Karangān; also known as Keremgān and Garīgān) is a village in Bizaki Rural District, Golbajar District, Chenaran County, Razavi Khorasan Province, Iran. At the 2006 census, its population was 274, in 68 families.

References 

Populated places in Chenaran County